Fubuhe station is a subway station in Changsha, Hunan, China, operated by the Changsha subway operator Changsha Metro. It is the largest subway station in Changsha.

Station layout
The station has one island platform.

History
Construction began in June 2015 and the station was completed in February 2019. The station opened on 26 May 2019.

Surrounding area
 Central South University
 Xiangcai Kindergarten
 Dujiatang School
 Yuenanlu School
 Changsha Tianma Hospital

References

Railway stations in Hunan
Railway stations in China opened in 2019